The Celestial Alphabet, also known as Angelic Script, is an set of characters described by Heinrich Cornelius Agrippa in the 16th century. It is not to be confused with John Dee and Edward Kelley's Enochian alphabet, which is also sometimes called the Celestial alphabet. Other alphabets with a similar origin are Transitus Fluvii and Malachim.

Origin
The language was first made by scholars studying angelic kingdoms, specifically Heinrich Cornelius Agrippa, many centuries after the death of Jesus. The script was first published in his third book Of Occult Philosophy. The script and language was invented in order to communicate with angels and it was later claimed that these symbols were sent "by God", given to angels, and then passed along to humans. No known major books have come out written in this script.

Nowadays, it is still occasionally used in rituals.

Style
There are 22 known characters, most of which are based around Hebrew names, such as Gimel, Sameth, and Aleph. It is an abjad, meaning there are no vowels. It is read and written from left to right in horizontal lines.

In popular culture

A variant of the Celestial Alphabet is used in the NieR and Drakengard games, generally to form text which wind around spells and magical objects. In these series, this variant script is referred to as Angelic. For Nier: Automata in particular, where magic does not figure prominently, Angelic text is seen over the entrances to each of the Resource Recovery Units found in the latter half of the game. In NieR: Gestalt/Replicant, the words which form the Black Scrawl are the Angelic characters for A, T, G, and C, which stand for the four bases of DNA.

External links
Description of the Celestial Alphabet

References

Artificial scripts used in mysticism
Language and mysticism
Writing systems introduced in the 16th century
Abjad writing systems